The Fargo Force is a Tier I junior ice hockey team in the Western Conference of the United States Hockey League (USHL). The Force have won one league championship in 2018 and was awarded USHL Organization of the Year for 2008–09 and 2012–13.

History
In early 2007, Fargo was granted a USHL team, intended as an anchor tenant for the then-under-construction Urban Plains Center and owned by local businessman Ace Brandt. Dean Blais, former coach of the North Dakota Fighting Sioux hockey program, was hired as the franchise's initial coach and general manager. After a name-the-team contest, the choices were narrowed to Fargo Force, Fargo Phantoms, and Fargo Fire. Twelve people submitted the Force name; as a result, they won a dinner with head coach Dean Blais and each received two season tickets to the Force's inaugural season.

As a result of the Force's entry, the area's previous hockey team, the Fargo-Moorhead Jets of the North American Hockey League announced they were leaving the area in April 2008, and folded later that year.

Blais coached the team to the USHL's Clark Cup Finals in 2008–09, leaving to take the head coaching position at Nebraska-Omaha. His successor, Chad Johnson, a former assistant, again led the Force to the Clark Cup Finals in 2009–10. Assistant Jason Herter took over the team in 2010 when Johnson left to join the Lincoln Stars. Jason Herter left after the 2010–11 season to become an assistant coach at the University of Minnesota Duluth. John Marks became head coach after leaving the same position for the Winkler Flyers in Manitoba, Canada.

Marks retired following the 2014–15 season and was replaced by former University of North Dakota player/assistant coach Cary Eades, who had just led the Sioux Falls Stampede to the 2014–15 Clark Cup Championship. In 2018, Fargo won the Clark Cup Finals over the Youngstown Phantoms to win their first championship in team history. Following the 2018–19 season, Eades stepped down from his coaching position, retaining the general manager title, and associate coach Pierre-Paul Lamoureux was named head coach. Lamoureux left after the 2020–21 season and was replaced by Scott Langer who had spent the previous five seasons with the North American Hockey League's Aberdeen Wings. On October 16, 2021, owner Ace Brandt died of cancer. The league held a moment of silence in his honor and the Force will wear "AB" patches for the remainder of the season.

Season-by-season records

NHL draft picks
The Fargo Force have had the following players picked in the NHL draft.

Awards and player recognition 
Jack Adams – 2016–17 All-USHL Team, 2016-17 USHL Most Goals
Ryan Bischel – 2017 U.S. Junior Select Team
Dean Blais – 2008–09 USHL Coach of the Year
Hank Crone – 2016 U.S. Junior Select Team,
Cary Eades – 1991–92 USHL General Manager of the Year, 2012–13 USHL Coach of the Year
Ty Farmer – 2017–18 All-USHL Team
Teemu Kivihalme – 2013 U.S. Junior Select Team
Mike Lee – 2008–09 USHL Goaltender of the Year
Blake Lizotte – 2016–17 All-USHL Team, 2016 U.S. Junior Select Team
Michael Mancinelli – 2017–18 USHL All-Rookie Team
Strauss Mann – 2017–18 All-USHL Team
Ben Meyers – 2018–19 All-USHL Team
Zane McIntyre – 2011–12 USHL Goaltender of the Year
Josh Nodler – 2018 U.S. Junior Select Team 2018–19 USHL All-Rookie Team
Ryan O'Reilly – 2017–18 USHL All-Rookie Team, 2018 U.S. Junior Select Team
Clayton Phillips – 2016–17 USHL All-Rookie Team
Nate Schmidt – 2009–10 USHL All-Rookie Team
Jacob Schmidt-Svejstrup – 2017–18 All-USHL Team
Denis Smirnov – 2015–16 All-USHL Team
Anthony Taranto – 2008–09 All-USHL Team

Prospects games participants
Jack Adams – 2017 USHL/NHL Top Prospects Game
Kaden Bohlsen – 2019 USHL/NHL Top Prospects Game
Charlie Dovorany – 2017 USHL/NHL Top Prospects Game
Mikey Eyssimont – 2015 USHL/NHL Top Prospects Game
Cedric Fiedler – 2019 USHL/NHL Top Prospects Game
Gabe Guertler – 2013 USHL/NHL Top Prospects Game
Brendan Harms – 2013 USHL/NHL Top Prospects Game
Matt Kessel – 2018 USHL/NHL Top Prospects Game
Josh Nodler – 2019 USHL/NHL Top Prospects Game
Ryan O'Reilly – 2017 CCM/USA Hockey All-American Prospects Game, 2018 USHL/NHL Top Prospects Game
Clayton Phillips – 2016 CCM/USA Hockey All-American Prospects Game, 2017 USHL/NHL Top Prospects Game
Ryan Savage – 2017 CCM/USA Hockey All-American Prospects Game, 2018 USHL/NHL Top Prospects Game
Nate Schmidt – 2010 USHL All-Star Game
Jacob Schmidt-Svejstrup – 2018 USHL/NHL Top Prospects Game
Denis Smirnov – 2015 USHL/NHL Top Prospects Game
Riley Tufte – 2015 CCM/USA Hockey All-American Prospects Game
Luke Witkowski – 2009 USHL All-Star Game

Roster
As of September 21, 2022.

|}

References

External links
 Fargo Force official webpage

United States Hockey League teams
Sports in Fargo, North Dakota
Ice hockey teams in North Dakota
2008 establishments in North Dakota
Ice hockey clubs established in 2008